Rangin Ban may refer to:

Rangin Ban, Rumeshkhan, in Rumeshkhan County of Lorestan Province, Iran
Rangin Ban, Pol-e Dokhtar, in Pol-e Dokhtar County of Lorestan Province, Iran